Six new World records and ten new Olympic records were set at the 2014 Winter Olympics in Sochi.

Figure skating

The following new ISU best scores were set during this competition:

Short track speed skating

OR = Olympic record

Speed skating

OR = Olympic record, WR = World record

Other records
 Ole Einar Bjørndalen won gold at the 10 km sprint and mixed relay biathlon events, becoming the oldest Winter Olympics individual gold medalist at age 40; and the most successful Olympian in the history of the Winter Games with 13 medals, record number of total medals.
 Marit Bjørgen by winning her 6th career gold, in women's 30 km cross country race, equaled the record for most Winter Olympic medals by a woman, with 10. Of those with 10 medals, Stefania Belmondo and Raisa Smetanina, Bjørgen has the most golds. She surpassed the prior record holder for most female Olympic medals in cross country skiing, Lyubov Egorova, who has 9, 6 of them gold.
 Justine Dufour-Lapointe, 19 years 321 days, became the youngest freestyle skiing gold medalist, by winning women's moguls. She finished just ahead of her older sister silver medalist Chloe in women's moguls, her eldest sister, Maxime finished 12th. They became the third pair of sisters to finish 1–2 in an event at the Winter Games. It was the fifth time three siblings have competed at the same event at the Winter Games.
 Alexandre Bilodeau became the first freestyle skiing gold medalist to defend his Olympic title, and first repeat gold medalist, winning the men's moguls.
 Mario Matt, at age 34, became the oldest Olympic alpine skiing gold medalist, by winning the men's slalom.
 Henrik Kristoffersen, at age 19, became the youngest male Olympic alpine skiing medalist, winning bronze in men's slalom.
 Bode Miller, at age 36, became the oldest Olympic medalist in alpine skiing, winning a bronze in men's super-G.
 Mikaela Shiffrin, at age 18, became the youngest Olympic gold medalist in slalom, winning gold in women's slalom.
 Noriaki Kasai became the oldest athlete to win a ski-jumping Olympic medal.
 Armin Zöggeler, by winning bronze in men's luge, became the first Olympian to capture a medal in the same event in six consecutive Olympics, thus holding the record for most consecutive Olympics with medal wins in the same event.
 Vladimir Grigorev, at 31 years and 191 days, became the oldest man to win a short track speedskating Olympic medal, winning silver at the 1000 m event.
 Viktor Ahn became the first short track speedskater to win all four Olympic golds (500 m, 1000 m, 1500 m, 5000 m-relay), winning gold in 2014 in 500 m, 1000 m, 5000 m-relay, having golds from 2006 in 1000 m, 1500 m, 5000 m-relay, with the 500 m gold completing the four. He also became the short track speedskater with the most Olympic gold medals, with 6. He also has the most Olympic medals in short track with 8, tying Apolo Anton Ohno.
 Teemu Selänne, at age 43 years and 234 days, became the oldest ice hockey player to win an Olympic medal, by being part of Team Finland's bronze. He also holds the Olympic record for total ice hockey points, upping it to 43. He also shares the record for most appearances in ice hockey at the Olympics, appearing in 6.
 The Great Britain women's curling team beat both USA and Japan 12–3, equalling the Olympic record. In the game against USA, they scored seven points in one end, a new Olympic record.
 The Canadian women's curling team became the first women's team to win all of their matches in the tournament. They are also the first women's team to win all their round robin matches.
A total of eight podium sweeps were recorded during the Games, where one nation won the gold, silver and bronze medals in an event. This was three higher than the previous most, during Innsbruck 1964.

References

2014 Winter Olympics
2014 Winter Olympics